Goat Island is an island in Galveston County, Texas. It is just north of the Bolivar Peninsula. It was severely damaged by hurricanes in 2008.

Islands of Texas
Islands of Galveston County, Texas